Bayon Beer is a Cambodian beer. It is brewed at the Cambrew Brewery in Sihanoukville. It contains rice malt.

Cambrew says of the beer, "This exotic beer is brewed in Sihanoukville, Cambodia employing the best traditional processes. Bayon Beer embodies the full quality of an Asian beer with an alcohol content of between 5.0% to 5.2%. Bayon beer is essentially catered to Asian drinkers with a smooth and hoppy aroma to give a pleasant after taste."

References

Beer in Cambodia